The 1966–67 Hong Kong First Division League season was the 56th since its establishment.

League table

References
1966–67 Hong Kong First Division table (RSSSF)

Hong Kong First Division League seasons
Hong
football